Firuz Kazemzadeh (October 27, 1924 – May 17, 2017) was a Russian-born American historian who was professor emeritus of history at Yale University.

Biography
Firuz Kazemzadeh was born in Moscow to an Iranian father and a Russian mother. His father served in the Iranian embassy in Moscow. After completing his primary and secondary education in Moscow, Kazemzadeh (then aged 16) and his family moved to Iran. In 1944, during the height of World War II, he travelled from Tehran to the United States and entered Stanford University, graduating with distinction (Phi Beta Kappa) in 1946 and obtaining an MA in 1947. In 1950 Kazemzadeh received a Ph.D. in Russian history from Harvard University.

Kazemzadeh taught at Harvard in 1954 – 1956, then moved to Yale where he was professor of history until his retirement as professor emeritus in 1992. While at Yale, he also served as Master of Davenport College.

He was the author and co-author of a number of books on the history of Russia and Iran, as well as numerous articles and reviews for authoritative scholarly publications.

Between May 15, 1998 and May 14, 2003, Kazemzadeh served as a Commissioner on the United States Commission on International Religious Freedom, first appointed to this position in 1998 by President Bill Clinton, and in 2001, reappointed by US Senate Majority Leader Thomas Daschle.

Kazemzadeh was an adherent of the Baháʼí Faith and, from 1963 to 2000, served as a member of the National Spiritual Assembly of the Baháʼís of the United States. He was also a member of the Baháʼí National Council.

Publications
 
 
 
 
 
 
 (reprint of 1951 Philosophical Library edition)

Further research

References 

1924 births
2017 deaths
Writers from Moscow
Stanford University alumni
Harvard University alumni
Soviet emigrants to the United States
American people of Iranian descent
American people of Russian descent
20th-century American historians
Yale University faculty
Russian people of Iranian descent
Russian Bahá'ís
Iranian Bahá'ís
American Bahá'ís
20th-century Bahá'ís
21st-century Bahá'ís